Palace of Mirrors is the fourth and final full-length album by Estradasphere. It was released on September 19, 2006. Every track on the album is instrumental.

Track listing 
"Title" – 0:34
"Palace of Mirrors" – 3:41
"A Corporate Merger" – 8:16
"The Terrible Beautypower of Meow" – 4:01
"Colossal Risk" – 4:36
"The Unfolding Pause on the Threshold" – 4:17
"Smuggled Mutation" – 4:48
"Six Hands" – 1:12
"The Debutante" – 2:44
"Flower Garden of an Evil Man" – 6:16
"Those Who Know..." – 5:18
"Palace of Mirrors (Reprise)" – 6:20
"The Return" – 6:19

2006 albums
The End Records albums
Estradasphere albums